The 12th Pennsylvania Regiment also known as Northampton and Northumberland Defense Battalion was an American infantry unit that fought during the American Revolutionary War as part of the Continental Army. The regiment was raised 23 August 1776 at Sunbury, Pennsylvania, as a state militia regiment and later renamed the 12th Pennsylvania. In January 1777 the 12th was commanded by Colonel William Cooke at Princeton. Assigned to Thomas Conway's 3rd Pennsylvania Brigade, the regiment would see action at Brandywine, Germantown, and Monmouth. The regiment was merged into the 3rd Pennsylvania Regiment shortly after Monmouth and went out of existence.

References

External links
Bibliography of the Continental Army in Pennsylvania compiled by the 
United States Army Center of Military History

Pennsylvania regiments of the Continental Army
Military units and formations established in 1776
Military units and formations disestablished in 1778
1776 establishments in Pennsylvania
1778 disestablishments in the United States